Conduct money is money paid in some legal systems to a person under the compulsion of a summons to witness (subpoena) to pay for their expenses to attend in court. It generally incorporates a daily rate for each day the witness must attend in court (with a one-day minimum), plus a travel allowance to allow the witness to get to the place of the hearing. Generally, conduct money must be delivered with the summons for it to have legal effect. In some jurisdictions, however, failure to provide conduct money at the time the summons is served is only an irregularity but not fatal to the validity of the summons. Witnesses are generally entitled to additional conduct money if their attendance is required on more days than anticipated. Moreover, witnesses who are required to make an overnight stay to attend in court on more than one day are generally entitled to an allowance for accommodation and meals.

The rates for travel, daily attendance, accommodation and meals are generally set under a court tariff, and are fixed for all witnesses. A witness may not refuse to appear merely because they believe the conduct money is insufficient to make up for their lost wages or actual travel expenses. Witnesses may be paid more, but the additional cost cannot be claimed against the losing party – only the tariff amount can be recovered.

Occasionally, special witnesses, such as experts, may be entitled to receive conduct money under a higher tariff. As an example, in the Province of Ontario, witnesses in civil proceedings in the Superior Court are allowed a daily rate of 50.00 CAD. The travel allowance is $3.00 if the witness resides in the same city as the hearing; 24 cents per kilometre each way if the hearing is within 400 km (approx. 240 miles); or open ticket coach class airfare, plus 24 cents per kilometre to the nearest airport to both the witness and the place of hearing if the distance is over 400 km. The accommodation and meal allowance is $75.00 per overnight stay for anyone travelling more than a certain distance from the hearing.

Evidence law